The Orange Rio is a rebadged version of ZTE's X991. It is sold on the Orange network, and is a BlackBerry-styled phone directed to people on budgets or young users, with a QWERTY keyboard and a 2.4" touchscreen.

Specifications 
The Orange Rio has a 2.4 inch resistive touchscreen, unlike many other BlackBerry handsets and has a 320x240 (QVGA) resolution.
However, it lacks 3G or Wi-Fi connectivity, and has Class 10 GPRS connectivity.
It connects and charges using the mini-USB standard.
It is a 2G handset.
It is shipped with Opera's Opera Mini, and supports J2ME so users can load applications at their own will.

External links 
 Rio from Orange in black – Orange Shop (link dead)
 Orange Rio review – CNET
 Orange Rio – Full phone specifications

Orange S.A.
ZTE mobile phones